The Gulf Atlantic Diocese is a diocese of the Anglican Church in North America, comprising 44 congregations in the American states of Alabama, Florida, Georgia, Louisiana and Mississippi. Florida is the state with most congregations. The diocese was originally divided in five deaneries: Gainesville, Jacksonville, Savannah, Tallahassee and Western The diocese later changed the division into four deaneries, Central, Northeastern, Southern and Western.

History
The Gulf Atlantic Diocese origin goes back to the founding of the Anglican Alliance, which took place at the third diocesan chapter of the American Anglican Council, in November 2001, having Stephen Jecko, Bishop of Florida, as the main proponent. His main purposes were stated as to enforce what he and others saw as "orthodox Anglican belief" against "liberal innovations" in the Episcopal Church. The Episcopal Diocese of Florida was then one of the main proponents of this claimed orthodoxy among the Episcopalian dioceses.

The diocese was very critical of the consecration of Gene Robinson as the first openly non-celibate gay bishop of the Episcopal Church in 2003. Stephen Jecko stepped down in 2004, after joining Robert Duncan, Bishop of Pittsburgh, and an aggregate of 12 seceding Episcopalian bishops to create the Network of Anglican Communion Dioceses and Parishes. Jecko's successor as bishop was Samuel Howard, who despite sharing similar beliefs with the seceding bishops and parishes, declined to join the Network. Another move was led by Eric Dudley who left the Episcopal Diocese of Florida to form a new church, St. Peter's Anglican Church, under the auspices of the Church of Uganda, a move that was coordinated and supported by Stephen Jecko. Other seceding Episcopalians and Anglicans created the Anglican Alliance of North Florida.

After the birth of the Anglican Church in North America, the now called Anglican Alliance of North Florida and South Georgia reunited at Advent Christian Village, in Dowling Park, Florida, in a move to pass from a "Diocese in creation" to a full diocese in the newly created church, on August 29, 2009. In the reunion, 47 clergy delegates and 39 lay delegates were present in representation of 20 churches. The Inaugural Synod ratified a Constitution and Canons, electing Neil G. Lebhar as the first bishop of the new diocese. At the final meeting, the name of Gulf Atlantic Diocese was chosen for the new diocese.

The Provincial Council of the Anglican Church in North America, held on December 11, 2009, in Toronto, Canada, accepted as a full member the Gulf Atlantic Diocese and recognized Neil Lebhar as their first bishop.

On April 30, 2012, Lebhar announced in his pastoral letter that John E. Miller III, from Melbourne, Florida, of the Anglican Mission in the Americas, recently disaffiliated from the Anglican Church of Rwanda, would be received at the Gulf Atlantic Diocese as an Assisting Bishop for at least six months, as a temporary measure until the future of the AMiA is defined. It was also suggested the possible affiliation of some of his 20 congregations to the Diocese. Miller, as an Assisting Bishop, a newly created position, will be in charge of the process of transition of the AMiA parishes.

The diocese announced that St. Peter's Anglican Church in Tallahassee, Florida, had been declared the new cathedral, St Peter's Cathedral, in January 2018.

On 27 August 2022, The Rev'd Charles Alexander Farmer was ordained to the episcopacy and consecrated as the second Ordinary of the diocese at St Peter's Cathedral.

References

External links
Gulf Atlantic Diocese Official Website

Dioceses of the Anglican Church in North America
Anglican dioceses established in the 21st century
Anglican realignment dioceses
Anglicanism in the United States
Protestantism in Alabama
Christianity in Florida
Protestantism in Florida
Christianity in Georgia (U.S. state)
Protestantism in Georgia (U.S. state)
Christianity in Louisiana